Apna Tou Style Yehi Hai is a Pakistani sitcom aired on Play Entertainment. The sitcom premiered on 7 April 2018. It stars Maham Jawed, Sonia Rao, Mahi Baloch and Hanzala Shahid in main roles.

Cast and characters
Maham Jawed as Jenny; Lazy and fashionable girl who lives in Rental house, wants to become an actor and model but didn't get chance anywhere.
Sonia Rao as Amna; Owner of the rent house and sister of Aslam who is seeking for handsome boy to marry.
Mahi Baloch as Sonia; 23 year lad who came from Bahawalpur to Karachi in search for job of Air Hostess. She is also rented a portion in Amna's house.
Hanzala Shahid as Zulfiqar
Masroor Khan as Aslam Bhai; Owner of rent house who lives in London.
 Saqib Sameer as Aashiq, Servant of the house

References

External links

Pakistani television sitcoms
Pakistani drama television series
Comedy-drama television series
Urdu-language television shows
Television shows set in Karachi
2018 Pakistani television series debuts